Vihren Peak is a sharp peak rising to about 1150 m in Levski Ridge of the Tangra Mountains, eastern Livingston Island in the South Shetland Islands, Antarctica overlooking Devnya Valley and Huron Glacier to the north-northwest, and Magura Glacier to the southeast.

The feature is named after the homonymous summit of the Pirin Mountains in Bulgaria.

Location

Maps
 L.L. Ivanov et al. Antarctica: Livingston Island and Greenwich Island, South Shetland Islands. Scale 1:100000 topographic map. Sofia: Antarctic Place-names Commission of Bulgaria, 2005.
 L.L. Ivanov. Antarctica: Livingston Island and Greenwich, Robert, Snow and Smith Islands. Scale 1:120000 topographic map.  Troyan: Manfred Wörner Foundation, 2009.

References
 Vihren Peak. SCAR Composite Antarctic Gazetteer
 Bulgarian Antarctic Gazetteer. Antarctic Place-names Commission. (details in Bulgarian, basic data in English)

External links
 Vihren Peak. Copernix satellite image

Tangra Mountains